Tazeh Kand-e Jadid (also Romanized as Tāzeh Kand-e Jadīd) is a village in Tazeh Kand Rural District, Tazeh Kand District, Parsabad County, Ardabil Province, Iran. At the 2006 census, its population was 748, in 158 families.

References 

Towns and villages in Parsabad County